Pammeces phlogophora is a moth of the family Agonoxenidae. It was described by Walsingham in 1909. It is found in Panama.

References

Moths described in 1909
Agonoxeninae
Moths of Central America